Composition 98 is an album by composer Anthony Braxton featuring the title piece, recorded in 1981 performed by a quartet, and originally released on the hat ART label as a double LP containing live and studio versions of the composition, but only the studio version was rereleased on CD in 1990.

Track listing
 "Composition 98 (Studio)" - 48:30
 "Composition 98 (Live)" - 48:05

Personnel
Anthony Braxton - alto saxophone,  tenor saxophone,  soprano saxophone,  sopranino saxophone,  C melody saxophone 
Hugh Ragin - trumpet, piccolo trumpet, flugelhorn
Ray Anderson - trombone, alto trombone, slide trumpet
Marilyn Crispell - piano

References

Hathut Records albums
Anthony Braxton albums
1981 albums